Paul Vengola was an Indian actor in Malayalam cinema. He mainly acted in comedy roles and supporting roles. He was an active comedian during the 1970s and 1980s in Malayalam film.

Career
He was a drama artist before coming into film industry and had a drama troupe of his own. He had acted in more than 50 films. He was also a film distributor under the banner of Sheeba Films. He worked as an homeo doctor which many people does'nt know.

Filmography

 Manithali  (1984)
 Maniyara (1983) as Kunjabdulla
 Vaadaka Veettile Athidhi (1981)
 Benz Vasu (1980)
 Swathu (1980)
 Lovely (1979)
 Kazhukan (1979)
 Kanyaka (1978) as Pachu Pilla
 Balapareekshanam (1978)
 Beena (1978) as Pachan
 Kanalkattakal (1978) as Esperd Kunjapppu
 Karimpuli (1978)
 Varadakshina (1977)
 Madhuraswapnam (1977)
 Sukradasa (1977)
 Rathimanmadhan (1977)
 Aadyapaadam (1977)
 Amma (1976)
 Light House (1976)
 Aalinganam (1976) as Gangadharan
 Omanakkunju (1975)
 Chief Guest (1975)
 Ayodhya (1975) as Pakru
 Mattoru Seetha (1975)
 Ankathattu (1974)
 Bhoogolam Thiriyunnu (1974)
 Arakkallan Mukkaalkkallan (1974)
 College Girl (1974) as Konthan
 Sapthaswarangal (1974) as Pappukutty
 Alakal (1974)
 Urvashi Bharathi (1973)
 Driksakshi (1973) as Kuttappan
 Kalachakram (1973)
 Veendum Prabhatham (1973)
 Shaasthram Jayichu Manushyan Thottu (1973) as Shivam
 Football Champion (1973) as Paulose
 Pacha Nottukal (1973) as Lonappan
 Aaraadhika (1973)
 Ajnaathavasam (1973) as Geetha's Father
 Thekkan Kattu (1973) as Kora
 Maaya (1972) as Antony
 Akkarapacha (1972)
 Aaradi Manninte Janmi (1972) as Ramu
 Miss Mary (1972)
 Kandavarundo (1972) as Themmadiparamu
 Lakshyam (1972)
 Vidyarthikale Ithile Ithile (1972)
 Gangaasangamam (1971)
 Sumangali (1971) as Panchayat member Johnny
 Anaadha Shilpangal (1971) as Krishnankutty
 Poompaatta (1971)
 Vilaykku Vaangiya Veena (1971) as Kariya
 Marunaattil Oru Malayaali (1971)
 Kalithozhi (1971)
 Kaakkathampuraatti (1970)
 Lottery Ticket (1970)
 Vazhve Mayam (1970)
 Velliyazhcha (1969)
 Aalmaram (1969)
 Thalirukal (1967)
 Arakkillam (1967)
 Kayamkulam Kochunni as Moosu Thirumeni
 Archana (1966) as Pakshinottakkaran
 Kalanju Kittiya Thankam'' (1964)

References

 http://www.malayalachalachithram.com/profiles.php?i=3684
 https://web.archive.org/web/20140225142810/http://www.metromatinee.com/artist/Paul%20Vengola-7488

External links

 Paul Vengola at MSI

Indian male film actors
Male actors from Kochi
Male actors in Malayalam cinema
Year of birth missing
Possibly living people
20th-century Indian male actors